Borrelia is a genus of bacteria of the spirochete phylum. Several species cause Lyme disease, also called Lyme borreliosis, a zoonotic, vector-borne disease transmitted by ticks. Other species of Borrelia cause relapsing fever, and are transmitted by ticks or lice, depending on the species of bacteria. A few Borrelia species as Candidatus Borrelia mahuryensis harbor intermediate genetic features between Lyme disease and relapsing fever Borrelia. The genus is named after  French biologist Amédée Borrel (1867–1936), who first documented the distinction between a species of Borrelia, B. anserina, and the other known type of spirochete at the time, Treponema pallidum. This bacterium must be viewed using dark-field microscopy, which make the cells appear white against a dark background. Borrelia species are grown in  Barbour-Stoenner-Kelly medium. Of 52 known species of Borrelia, 20 are members of the Lyme disease group (with an additional 3 proposed), 29 belong to the relapsing fever group, and two are members of a genetically distinct third group typically found in reptiles. A proposal has been made to split the Lyme disease group based on genetic diversity and move them to their own genus, Borelliella, but this change is not widely accepted. This bacterium uses hard and soft ticks and lice as vectors. Testing for the presence of the bacteria in a human includes two-tiered serological testing, including immunoassays and immunoblotting.

Biology 
Borrelia species are members of the family Spirochaetaceae, so present the characteristic spirochete (spiral) shape. Most species  are obligate anaerobes, although some are aerotolerant. Borrelia species have an outer membrane that contains a substance similar to lipopolysaccharides, an inner membrane, and a layer of peptidoglycan in a periplasmic space, which classifies them as Gram-negative. However, this result is not easily visualized using Gram staining. They are typically 20–30 μm long and 0.2–0.3 μm wide.

Spirochetes move using axial filaments called endoflagella in their periplasmic space. The filaments rotate in this space, between the outer membrane and the peptidoglycan layer, propelling the bacterium forward in a corkscrew-like motion. The outer membrane of Borrelia species contains outer surface proteins (Osp) that play a role in their virulence.

Phylogeny
The currently accepted taxonomy is based on the List of Prokaryotic names with Standing in Nomenclature (LPSN) and National Center for Biotechnology Information (NCBI).

Notes:
♦ Type strain lost or not available

Unassigned species:
 "Ca. Borrelia africana" Ehounoud et al. 2016
 "Ca. Borrelia algerica" Fotso et al. 2015
 "Ca. Borrelia aligera" Norte et al. 2020
 Borrelia baltazardii corrig. Karimi et al. 1979 ex Karimi et al. 1983
 Borrelia brasiliensis ♦ Davis 1952
 Borrelia caucasica ♦ (Kandelaki 1945) Davis 1957
 Borrelia dugesii ♦ (Mazzotti 1949) Davis 1957
 "Ca. Borrelia fainii" Qiu et al. 2019
 Borrelia graingeri ♦ (Heisch 1953) Davis 1957
 Borrelia harveyi ♦ (Garnham 1947) Davis 1948
 "Ca. Borrelia ibitipocensis" corrig. Muñoz-Leal et al. 2020
 "Ca. Borrelia ivorensis" Ehounoud et al. 2016
 "Ca. Borrelia javanense" Jiang et al. 2021
 "Ca. Borrelia johnsonii" Schwan et al. 2009
 "Ca. Borrelia kalaharica" Fingerle et al. 2016
 Borrelia latyschewii ♦ (Sofiev 1941) Davis 1948
 "Borrelia lonestari" Barbour et al. 1996
 "Ca. Borrelia mahuryensis" Binetruy et al. 2020
 Borrelia mazzottii ♦ Davis 1956
 "Borrelia merionesi" Hougen 1974
 "Borrelia microti" (Rafyi 1946) Davis 1948
 "Ca. Borrelia mvumii" Mitani et al. 2004
 "Borrelia myelophthora" (Steiner 1931) Ahrens & Muschner 1958
 "Ca. Borrelia paulista" Weck et al. 2022
 "Borrelia puertoricensis" Bermudez et al. 2021
 Borrelia theileri ♦ (Laveran 1903) Bergey et al. 1925
 Borrelia tillae ♦ Zumpt & Organ 1961
 Borrelia venezuelensis ♦ (Brumpt 1921) Brumpt 1922
 Borreliella americana (Rudenko et al. 2010) Adeolu & Gupta 2018
 "Borreliella andersonii" (Marconi, Liveris & Schwartz 1995) Adeolu & Gupta 2014
 Borreliella carolinensis (Rudenko et al. 2011) Adeolu & Gupta 2015
 Borreliella kurtenbachii (Margos et al. 2013) Adeolu & Gupta 2015
 "Borreliella lusitaniae" (Le Fleche et al. 1997) Adeolu & Gupta 2014
 "Borreliella tanukii" (Fukunaga et al. 1997) Adeolu & Gupta 2014
 Borreliella sinica (Masuzawa et al. 2001) Adeolu & Gupta 2015
 "Ca. Borreliella texasensis" (Lin et al. 2005) Adeolu & Gupta 2014

Vectors

Ticks 

Hard ticks of the family Ixodidae are common vectors of Borellia bacteria and are the only type of ticks shown to transmit Lyme disease bacteria to humans. Some tick species of the Ambylomma genus are vectors of Candidatus Borrelia mahuryensis in South America.

Other species are carried by soft ticks. The soft tick Ornithodoros carries the species of Borellia that cause relapsing fever. Another species, B. anserina, is carried by the soft tick Argas. Inside the ticks, the bacteria grow in the midgut and then travel to the salivary glands to be transmitted to a new host. Ticks can spread the bacteria to each other when co-feeding. If an animal has been infected by a tick and then is bitten by a second tick, the second tick can become infected. The bacteria are most commonly transmitted to humans through ticks in the nymph stage of development, because they are smaller and less likely to be noticed and removed. The ticks must have around 36 to 48 hours of contact with a host to successfully transmit the bacteria.

Lice 

Lice that feed on infected humans acquire the Borrelia organisms that then multiply in the hemolymph and gut of the lice. When an infected louse feeds on an uninfected human, the organism gains access when the victim crushes the louse or scratches the area where the louse is feeding. The U. S. Centers for Disease Control and Prevention reported that  no credible evidence shows that lice can carry Borrelia.

Lyme disease

Of the 52 known species of Borrelia, 20 belong to the Lyme disease group and are transmitted by ticks. Eight are known to cause Lyme disease or Borreliosis. The major Borrelia species causing Lyme disease are Borrelia burgdorferi, Borrelia afzelii, and Borrelia garinii. All species that cause Lyme disease are referred to collectively as B. burgdorferi sensu lato, while B. burgdorferi itself is specified as B. burgdorferi sensu stricto. B. burgdorferi was previously believed to be the only species to cause Lyme disease in the US, but B. bissettiae and a new species called B. mayonii cause Lyme disease in the US, as well. The remaining five human pathogenic species occur only in Europe and Asia.

Relapsing fever

Relapsing fever (RF) borreliosis often occurs with severe bacteremia. Twenty-five species of Borrelia  are known to cause relapsing fever. While most species use the soft tick family Argasidae as their vector, some outliers  live in hard ticks or lice. Relapsing fever can be spread epidemically through lice or endemically through ticks.

B. recurrentis, a common species underlying relapsing fever, is transmitted by the human body louse; no other animal reservoir of B. recurrentis is known. B. recurrentis infects the person via mucous membranes and then invades the bloodstream.

Other tick-borne relapsing infections are acquired from other species, such as B. hermsii, B. parkeri, or B. miyamotoi, which can be spread from rodents, and serve as a reservoir for the infection, via a tick vector. B. hermsii and B. recurrentis cause very similar diseases, although the disease associated with B. hermsii has more relapses and is responsible for more fatalities, while the disease caused by B. recurrentis has longer febrile and afebrile intervals and a longer incubation period.

Diagnosis 
Direct tests include culture of Borrelia from skin, blood, or cerebrospinal fluid (CSF), and detection of genetic material by polymerase chain reaction in skin, blood, or synovial fluid. Two-tiered serological testing is performed for differential diagnosis of Borrelia infection. The first-tier tests detect specific antibodies (IgM and IgG together or separately) and include enzyme-linked immunoassays (e.g. ELISAs) and immunofluorescent assays. Positive results for first-tier tests are confirmed using second-tier testing. The second tier consists of standardized immunoblotting, either by using Western blots or blots striped with diagnostically important purified antigens. Positive results for second-tier tests are confirmatory for the presence of Borrelia infection. Spirochetes can also be seen using Wright-stained blood smears.

References

Further reading

External links 
 Borrelia genomes and related information at   PATRIC, a Bioinformatics Resource Center funded by   NIAID
 Borrelia Microbe Wiki Page
 NCBI Borrelia Taxonomy Browser

 
Lyme disease
Spirochaetes
Bacteria genera